The St. Croix Downeasters were a minor league baseball team based in Calais, Maine in partnership with neighboring St. Stephen, New Brunswick. In 1913, the St. Croix Downeasters played the season as members of the Class D level New Brunswick-Maine League. The league folded during the season, with the Downeasters in 3rd place. The Downeasters hosted minor league home games at Athletic Field in Calais, Maine.

History
Minor league baseball began in Calais, Maine in 1913, when the St. Croix Downeasters became charter members of the four–team Class D level New Brunswick-Maine League. The Bangor Maroons, Fredericton Pets and St. John Marathons joined the Downeasters in beginning play on June 8, 1913.

The team use of the "St. Croix Downeasters" name derives from the Saint Croix River which separates Calais, Maine and St. Stephen, New Brunswick. The "Downeasters" moniker corresponds to the Downeast nickname for the region, which derived from sailing terminology.

After beginning the season schedule, the New Brunswick-Maine League permanently folded on August 23, 1913. The St. Croix Downeasters were in third place with a record of 31–30 when the New Brunswick-Maine League folded. The Downeasters were managed by Ernest Doyle as St. Croix finished 8.0 games behind the first place Fredericton Pets in the final standings. In the overall final standings, the St. Croix Downeasters finished behind the Fredericton Pets (41–24) and 2nd place Saint John Marathons (41–29) and ahead of the 4th place Bangor Maroons (18–48) in the 1913 New Brunswick-Maine League standings. St Croix pitcher Billy Lee led the New Brunswick-Maine League with 118 strikeouts.

The New Brunswick-Maine League did not return to play in 1914 and never reformed.Calais, Maine and St. Stephen, New Brunswick have not hosted another minor league team.

Today, the Collegiate summer baseball affiliated "St. Croix River Hounds" play as members of the Northwoods League.

The ballpark
The 1913 St. Croix Downeasters were noted to have played minor league home games at Athletic Field. The ballpark was reportedly located Between Calais Avenue & Lafayette Street, Calais, Maine. The referenced location corresponds to the site of today's Thomas DiCenzo Athletic Complex, which includes ballfields.

Year–by–year record

Notable alumni

Merwin Jacobson (1913)
Billy Lee (1913)
Pat Parker (1913)

See also
St. Croix Downeasters players

References

External links
Calais - Baseball Reference

Defunct minor league baseball teams
Calais, Maine
Professional baseball teams in Maine
Defunct baseball teams in Maine
Baseball teams established in 1913
Baseball teams disestablished in 1913
1913 establishments in Maine
1913 disestablishments in Maine